Alexander Vasilyevich Burdonsky (October 14, 1941 – May 23, 2017) was a Russian theater and film director and grandson of General Secretary of the Communist Party of the Soviet Union Joseph Stalin. He directed more than 20 plays at The Moscow Theater, and also directed films including Playing On the Keys of The Soul and This Madman Platanov. In 1996, Burdonsky was awarded the People's Artist of Russia Award for his works.

Burdonsky died of cancer on May 23, 2017, at the age of 75. He was predeceased in 2006 by his wife, a Lithuanian teacher and theatre director.

References

External links
 Биография на сайте Театра Российской армии
 Внук Иосифа Сталина Александр Бурдонский: Дед был настоящим тираном…

1941 births
2017 deaths
Soviet theatre directors
Russian theatre directors
People's Artists of Russia
Joseph Stalin
Deaths from cancer in Russia
Russian Academy of Theatre Arts alumni
Burials at Vagankovo Cemetery
Russian people of Georgian descent